Rivercrest Independent School District is a public school district based in Bogata, Texas (USA). Created in 1965, it was the Talco-Bogata Consolidated Independent School District until July 1999.

The district covers southwestern Red River County, northwestern Titus County (including the city of Talco), and a portion of northeastern Franklin County.

In 2009, the school district was rated "recognized" by the Texas Education Agency.

Schools
Rivercrest High School (Grades 9-12)
State champions in basketball, 2006
Rivercrest Junior High (Grades 6-8)
Rivercrest Elementary (Grades PK-5)
All three schools, along with the administration building and athletic facilities, are located at one campus on U.S. Highway 271 near the community of Johntown, Texas.

It previously maintained Bogata Elementary and Talco Elementary. The previous Talco school opened in 1939. The district began construction of the consolidated elementary on May 1, 2000 and the scheduled completion was in June 2001.

References

External links
Rivercrest ISD

School districts in Red River County, Texas
School districts in Titus County, Texas
School districts in Franklin County, Texas
School districts established in 1965
1965 establishments in Texas